Harry Wakefield Bramma (born 11 November 1936, Shipley, West Yorkshire) is a British organist and composer of Anglican church music. He served as director of the Royal School of Church Music from 1989 to 1998 and as director of music at All Saints, Margaret Street, 1989–2004.

Bramma was educated at Bradford Grammar School and his early musical education included organ lessons under Melville Cook, organist of Leeds Parish Church. He went on to read theology and music at  Oxford University from 1955 to 1960, studying as organ scholar of Pembroke College. He graduated Bachelor of Arts in 1958 and Master of Arts in 1960.

Bramma initially started a career in teaching, and held the post of director of music at the King Edward VI School, Retford 1961–63. In 1963 he took the job as assistant organist at Worcester Cathedral, under Christopher Robinson, also becoming director of music at the King's School, Worcester in 1965. Bramma's students at the King's School included a number of noted musicians, among them Nicholas Cleobury, Stephen Cleobury, Andrew Millington, Jonathan Nott, Adrian Partington and Geoffrey Webber.

In 1976 became organist and director of music at Southwark Cathedral, and in 1989 moved on to become director of the Royal School of Church Music.

He has been noted as an influential composer of modern church music. His compositions include settings of the ancient Latin Christian hymns O Salutaris and Tantum Ergo; I will receive the cup of salvation, a setting of poetic text by St. Teresa of Avila; Alleluya. This is the day; an arrangement of the Eastern Orthodox funeral hymn Kontakion of the Departed; a set of preces and responses; and music for Advent and Christmas.

References 
 ‘BRAMMA, Harry Wakefield’, Who's Who 2011, A & C Black, 2011; online edn, Oxford University Press, Dec 2010 ; online edn, Oct 2010 accessed 30 July 2011
 

1936 births
Living people
British classical organists
British male organists
Cathedral organists
British classical composers
British male classical composers
Classical composers of church music
People from Shipley, West Yorkshire
Alumni of Pembroke College, Oxford
Musicians from Bradford
21st-century English composers
20th-century English composers
People educated at Bradford Grammar School
20th-century classical composers
21st-century classical composers
21st-century organists
20th-century British male musicians
21st-century British male musicians
Male classical organists